The Pretender is a 1947 crime drama film noir directed by W. Lee Wilder starring Albert Dekker, Catherine Craig, Charles Drake and Alan Carney.

Plot
The story tells of Kenneth Holden (Dekker), a crooked investment businessman who embezzles a large sum of money from an estate.  He hopes to cover his crime by marrying the estate's heiress Claire Worthington (Craig).

However, Worthington is already engaged, so Holden arranges for her fiancé to be killed. The hired hit man's only means of identifying the victim is the picture in the society columns. When Claire Worthington changes her mind and agrees to marry Holden, however, it means that it is his picture that will appear in the newspaper, thereby condemning him to death.

Desperately trying to contact the hit man, Holden discovers that the man is dead, but his successor is still at large.

Cast
 Albert Dekker as Kenneth Holden
 Catherine Craig as Claire Worthington
 Charles Drake as Dr. Leonard Koster
 Alan Carney as Victor Korrin
 Linda Stirling as Flo Ronson
 Tom Kennedy as Fingers
 Selmer Jackson as Charles Lennox
 Charles Middleton as William the butler
 Ernie Adams as Thomas the butler
 Ben Welden as Mickie
 John Bagni as Hank Gordon
 Stanley Ross as Stranger
 Forrest Taylor as Dr. Harold Stevens
 Greta Clement as Margie
 Peter Michael as Stephen
 Peggy Wynne as Miss Chalmers
 Eula Guy as First Nurse
 Cay Forrester as Evelyn Cossett
 Michael Mark as Mike - Janitor
 Dorothy Scott as Miss Michael

Critical reception
Critic Dennis Schwartz liked the film and wrote, "Billy Wilder's lesser known elder brother William Lee Wilder...directs this striking film noir about a successful man becoming paranoiac and placing himself in entrapment. In one amazing characteristic noir scene, the protagonist is seated on the floor of his unlit, locked room eating crackers and canned food, afraid of being poisoned. This is one of the first movies to score for theremin, an effectively chilling mood music which later became a cliché for many 1950s sci-fi films about aliens. John Alton's dark film noir photography sets the proper mood for the melodrama. The film noir is absorbing despite stilted dialogue and flat direction."

See also
 List of American films of 1947

References

External links
 
 
 
 

1947 films
1940s crime thriller films
American crime thriller films
American black-and-white films
Film noir
Republic Pictures films
Films scored by Paul Dessau
Films directed by W. Lee Wilder
1940s English-language films
1940s American films